This is a list of notable academic journals about nursing.

AACN Advanced Critical Care
AACN Nursing Scan in Critical Care
Advance for NPs & PAs
Advances in Neonatal Care
American Journal of Critical Care
American Journal of Nursing
Australian Critical Care
AORN Journal
BMC Nursing
British Journal of Cardiac Nursing
British Journal of Community Nursing
Canadian Journal of Nursing Research
Cancer Nursing
Cancer Nursing Practice
Clinical Nurse Specialist
Critical Care Nurse
European Journal of Cancer Care
European Journal of Cardiovascular Nursing
European Journal of Oncology Nursing
Evidence-Based Nursing (journal)
Gastrointestinal Nursing
Geriatric Nursing
Heart & Lung
Human Resources for Health
International Emergency Nursing
International Journal of Nursing Knowledge
International Journal of Nursing Studies
International Journal of Mental Health Nursing
International Journal of Older People Nursing
Issues in Mental Health Nursing
The Journal for Nurse Practitioners
Journal of Addictions Nursing
Journal of Advanced Nursing
Journal of the Association of Nurses in AIDS Care
Journal of Child Health Care
Journal of Continuing Education in Nursing
Journal of Holistic Nursing
Journal of Nursing Education
Journal of Nursing Management
Journal of Nursing Scholarship
Journal of Obstetric, Gynecologic, & Neonatal Nursing
Journal of Orthopaedic Nursing
Journal of Pediatric Nursing
Journal of Pediatric Oncology Nursing
Journal of PeriAnesthesia Nursing
Journal of Perinatal & Neonatal Nursing
Journal of Psychosocial Nursing and Mental Health Services
Journal of Research in Nursing
Journal of Tissue Viability
Learning Disability Practice
MCN
Mental Health Practice
NASN School Nurse
Neonatal Network
Nurse Researcher
Nursing Children and Young People
Nursing Ethics
Nursing in Practice
Nursing Management
Nursing Older People
Nursing Outlook
Nursing Research
Nursing Standard
Nursing Times
Orthopaedic Nursing
Pediatric Nursing
Primary Health Care
Research in Nursing & Health
Western Journal of Nursing Research
Workplace Health & Safety

See also

List of medical journals

Nursing j
Nursing